Xanthophyllum pauciflorum is a tree in the family Polygalaceae. The specific epithet  is from the Latin meaning "few  flowers", referring to the inflorescences.

Description
The smooth bark is greyish. The flowers are yellowish, drying yellowish orange.

Distribution and habitat
Xanthophyllum pauciflorum is endemic to Borneo.

References

pauciflorum
Endemic flora of Borneo
Trees of Borneo
Plants described in 1973